Marko Arnautović (born 19 April 1989) is an Austrian professional footballer who plays as a forward for Serie A club Bologna and the Austria national team.

Arnautović began his career in his native Austria playing in the youth teams for a number of clubs in the Vienna area before he signed a contract with Dutch club Twente in 2006. He impressed at De Grolsch Veste and after a fine 2008–09 season he joined Italian giants Inter Milan on loan, where he made only three appearances due to injury. He joined German side Werder Bremen in June 2010 and became a regular member of the first-team. In September 2013, Arnautović joined English side Stoke City, where he scored 26 goals in 145 appearances. He joined West Ham United in July 2017 for a fee of £20 million and won the Hammer of the Year award in his debut season. He scored 22 goals in 65 games for West Ham over two seasons before joining Shanghai SIPG (now Shanghai Port) for £22.4 million in July 2019. Arnautović returned to Europe to join Italian club Bologna in August 2021.

A full international with over 100 caps for Austria since 2008, Arnautović helped the nation to qualify for the UEFA European Championship in 2016 and 2020. He was named Austrian Footballer of the Year in 2018. Arnautović is the most capped and joint-second highest scoring player in the history of the Austria national football team.

Club career

Early career
Arnautović began his career with his brother Danijel at Floridsdorfer AC. In 1998, he joined FK Austria Wien but behaviour issues saw him change club regularly as in the next six years he played for First Vienna FC 1894, a second spell at FK Austria Wien, SK Rapid Wien before he returned to Floridsdorfer AC. Despite this he was scouted by Dutch club FC Twente who signed him in 2006.

Twente
Arnautović scored 22 goals in 24 matches for the Under-19 FC Twente in the 2007–08 season, helping them win the youth championship. He then played for Jong FC Twente between 2006 and 2008, appearing in 32 matches and scoring 27 goals. Arnautović made his professional debut for FC Twente in the 2006–07 season as a substitute for Kennedy Bakircioglu against PSV Eindhoven in April 2007. In July 2008, he extended his contract with Twente despite interest from Dutch giant Feyenoord.

He made 16 appearances in 2007–08 as Twente finished in fourth position and qualified for the UEFA Champions League. In the 2008–09 season Arnautović scored 14 goals in 41 matches as Twente finished 2nd in the Eredivisie and reached the knock out phase of the UEFA Cup. In March 2009 after a league match against Willem II, one of Twente opponents, Ibrahim Kargbo, accused Arnautović of racially abusing him. After an investigation by the Dutch Football Association they found no evidence against him and the case was dismissed.

Loan to Inter Milan
On 4 August 2009, it was said that Arnautović was on the verge of a move to Italian giants Inter Milan. The deal had been largely held up due to a stress fracture in Arnautović's right foot, leading to a re-negotiation of the deal between the clubs. On 6 August, it was announced by Twente that the details for the loan had been finalised, Arnautović would join Inter on loan for the season. The deal was said to become permanent if he was to play a set number of matches. If the deal did not become permanent the player would return to Twente on a pre-agreed contract of two years, with an option to extend the contract for a third year. He made his unofficial debut for Inter in a friendly match on 5 September 2009 against Swiss team, Lugano, the final score was 3–3.

He made his league debut in a 1–0 away victory against Chievo on 6 January 2010. He played in their next match against Siena coming on as a substitute at half time for the injured Dejan Stanković and helped Inter to win the match 4–3. He played one more match for Inter against Atalanta on 24 April 2010. At the end of the season Inter decided against turning his loan in a permanent move with manager José Mourinho stating that Arnautović "is a fantastic person but has the attitude of a child".

Werder Bremen

On 4 June 2010, Bundesliga club Werder Bremen confirmed that they had signed Arnautović from Twente on a four-year deal. Before he had played a match for Bremen he irked their captain Torsten Frings who branded him as "arrogant". He made his Bundesliga debut on 21 August 2010 in a 4–1 defeat against Hoffenheim. Arnautović scored twice against 1. FC Köln on 28 August 2010, his first goals for Bremen. He ended the 2010–11 season at the Weserstadion with five goals in 34 appearances as Bremen finished in 13th position and he also played in the Champions League. In 2011–12, he scored six goals in 20 appearances as Bremen finished in ninth position in the Bundesliga. In March 2012, he was ruled out for two months with a knee ligament injury he suffered whilst playing with his dog.

In 2012–13, Arnautović played in 27 matches and scored five goals which included a hat-trick on 2 December 2012 away at Hoffenheim, including an impressive free kick, as Bremen won 4–1. In April 2013, Arnautović and his Bremen teammate Eljero Elia were caught speeding and were both suspended by the club.

Stoke City
On 2 September 2013, Arnautović joined Premier League side Stoke City on a four-year contract for a fee of £2 million. He was assigned the number 10 shirt by manager Mark Hughes who also described his signing as a coup—"People will very quickly see what an outstanding talent he is. In terms of his power and his pace, which is something I think we need in the squad, he ticks all the boxes. Technically he's excellent and I'm really looking forward to working with him. I think it's quite a coup to get him here. It made sense to us and made sense to him that this is the right club for him. He's got a real desire to make an impression." Arnautović made his Stoke debut twelve days later in a 0–0 draw against Manchester City at the Britannia Stadium. After spending a month at the club, manager Hughes stated that Arnautović had adapted well to English football after being given a free-role in the side. On 26 October, he scored his first goal for Stoke, a 25-yard free-kick in a 3–2 defeat against Manchester United. Arnautović ended his first season in England with five goals in 35 appearances, and the team finished in ninth position in the Premier League.

After making little impact in the first few matches of the 2014–15 season, Arnautović lost his place in the side. He regained his form towards the end of the campaign and returned to a regular place. He scored once in 29 league appearances over the campaign: a 95th-minute equaliser against West Ham United on 11 April 2015, having earlier in the match had two goals disallowed for offside. He played 35 times in 2014–15 season as Stoke finished in ninth position.

Arnautović's first appearance of the 2015–16 season came in a 2–2 draw with Tottenham Hotspur at White Hart Lane on 15 August, scoring the team's first goal as they came back from 2–0 down. He scored the only goal of Stoke's victory over champions Chelsea on 7 November, and both goals against Manchester City on 5 December in a 2–0 home victory. On 28 December, Arnautović won a last-minute penalty kick against Everton at Goodison Park when he was fouled by John Stones, and sent it past goalkeeper Tim Howard to win the match 4–3. He scored the only goal of the League Cup semi-final second leg against Liverpool on 26 January 2016, forcing a penalty shootout which his team eventually lost. Arnautović went on to play 40 times for Stoke in 2015–16, finishing as the top scorer with 12 goals as the Potters again finished in ninth position.

Arnautović signed a new four-year contract with Stoke in July 2016, keeping him contracted with the Potters until the summer of 2020. Arnautović made 35 appearances in 2016–17, as Stoke finished in 13th position. He scored seven goals including braces against Sunderland and Middlesbrough.

Arnautović's future at Stoke was cast in doubt prior to the start of the 2017–18 season after he submitted a transfer request.

West Ham United

On 22 July 2017, Arnautović signed for fellow Premier League team West Ham United on a five-year contract for a club record £20 million fee, which could rise to £25 million with add-ons.

He made his debut on 13 August, playing the full 90 minutes of a 4–0 loss to Manchester United at Old Trafford. In his next game six days later, he was sent off after 33 minutes for elbowing Southampton's Jack Stephens in a 3–2 away loss.

In November, new manager David Moyes said that Arnautović had to work harder and be more of a team player or be dropped. He scored his first goal for the club on 9 December, the only one of a win over reigning champions Chelsea at the London Stadium, in what was Moyes' first victory as West Ham manager. He followed this with a goal in his first return to the Bet365 Stadium in a 0–3 win against Stoke City on 16 December. Following his conversion from a winger to a centre-forward at West Ham, Arnautović scored 11 Premier League goals in his first season at the club; his goal against Everton on the final day of the campaign making him the first West Ham player to reach that figure since Bobby Zamora in 2006–07. In April 2018, he was named as Hammer of the Year for the 2017–18 season.

In January 2019, he was the subject of a £35 million transfer offer from a Chinese club, believed to be Shanghai SIPG, which his agent and brother, Danijel, said Arnautović wanted West Ham to accept. Despite this, on 26 January, Arnautović committed himself to West Ham by signing a contract extension of unspecified length. He also received a 20% increase raising his weekly wage to £120,000. A £40 million release clause was also added to his contract. Arnautović finished the 2018–19 season as West Ham's leading goal scorer, with 11 goals. In July 2019, West Ham rejected an offer of £19.7 million from a Chinese club as Arnautović said he wanted to leave.

Shanghai Port
On 7 July 2019, Arnautović signed for Shanghai SIPG (later rebranded as Shanghai Port) for a fee of £22.4 million. He scored on his debut two weeks later, a 2–2 draw at Chongqing Dangdai Lifan in the Chinese Super League.

Bologna
On 1 August 2021, Arnautović signed a two-year deal with Serie A side Bologna. On 15 August, Arnautović made his debut for Bologna, in a 5–4 defeat against Ternana in the first round of the Coppa Italia, scoring a goal in the 56th minute.

International career

Youth 
Arnautović played with the Austrian under-19 side in the 2007 UEFA European Under-19 Championship where he was sent-off in their second match and failed to make it out of the group stage. He made four appearances in total at under-19 level. He scored three goals in five matches for the Austria under-21 team. After scoring a free-kick in an under-21 game against Denmark in March 2010, Arnautović earned praise from manager Andreas Herzog who described him as the best Austrian footballer of the last 30 years.

Senior 
Arnautović is currently the joint-second highest all-time top goal scorer for the Austria national football team with 34 goals, behind Toni Polster and level with Hans Krankl. He is the most capped player in the national team's history with 106 caps.

Arnautović played his first match for the Austria national senior team on 11 October 2008, against the Faroe Islands. He scored his first goals for Austria in a 3–0 win over Azerbaijan on 8 October 2010.

Arnautović started in all ten of Austria's matches during their successful UEFA Euro 2016 qualifying campaign, scoring in a win over Montenegro and both fixtures against neighbours Liechtenstein.

Arnautović started all but one of Austria's qualification matches for the 2018 FIFA World Cup, only missing the game against the Republic of Ireland through suspension. He scored four goals in the 10 games, but Austria's fourth-place finish would not be enough for qualification.

On 13 June 2021, Arnautović scored the third goal for Austria during the first game of UEFA Euro 2020 Group C against North Macedonia. During the goal celebration, he was accused of using racist slurs against Ezgjan Alioski and Egzon Bejtulai from the rival team, who are both Macedonian Albanians. Afterwards, he apologized for his words but denied his language was racist. UEFA later announced an investigation into Arnautović's actions. He was banned by UEFA for one game for "insulting another player", resulting in him missing Austria's next game in Euro 2020 against the Netherlands. UEFA did not find the language to be discriminatory.

On 6 June 2022, he played his 100th match for Austria in a 2–1 defeat against Denmark in the 2022–23 UEFA Nations League A.

Style of play
Possessing a powerful physique and good technique, Arnautović is known for his eye for goal, as well as ability to hold up the ball with his back to goal and bring his teammates into play with his link-up play. Despite his size, he also possesses significant pace and stamina, and is known for his ability to exploit spaces with his runs or run at opponents with the ball, while his height helps him to win aerial challenges. A versatile forward, he is capable of playing in several offensive positions, including as a winger, as a centre-forward, or as a striker. Despite his playing ability, however, he was also a temperamental player, who was involved in several controversial incidents throughout his career. His skills and playing style have led him to be compared to Swedish striker Zlatan Ibrahimović in the media.

Personal life
Arnautović was born in Floridsdorf, a district in the northern part of Vienna, to a Serbian father and an Austrian mother. 
Arnautović is an Orthodox Christian. He is married to Sarah (née Lizakowski), and together they have two daughters, Emilia and Alicia. During his time spent in Italy and Germany, Arnautović developed a reputation with the media as "the bad boy of Austrian football". Speaking on the matter in October 2013, he admitted he was "not an angel" but insisted the birth of his daughter had made him "grow up."

Career statistics

Club

International

Scores and results list Austria's goal tally first, score column indicates score after each Arnautović goal.

Honours
Inter Milan

 UEFA Champions League: 2009–10
 Serie A: 2009–10
Coppa Italia: 2009–10

Individual
West Ham United Hammer of the Year: 2017–18
Austrian Footballer of the Year: 2018

References

External links

 
 
 Marko Arnautović at Inter Milan official website

1989 births
Living people
People from Floridsdorf
Footballers from Vienna
Serb diaspora sportspeople
Austrian people of Serbian descent
Eastern Orthodox Christians from Austria
Austrian footballers
Association football forwards
FC Twente players
Inter Milan players
SV Werder Bremen players
Stoke City F.C. players
West Ham United F.C. players
Shanghai Port F.C. players
Bologna F.C. 1909 players
Eredivisie players
Serie A players
Bundesliga players
Premier League players
Chinese Super League players
UEFA Champions League winning players
Austria youth international footballers
Austria under-21 international footballers
Austria international footballers
UEFA Euro 2016 players
UEFA Euro 2020 players
Austrian expatriate footballers
Austrian expatriate sportspeople in the Netherlands
Austrian expatriate sportspeople in Italy
Austrian expatriate sportspeople in Germany
Austrian expatriate sportspeople in England
Austrian expatriate sportspeople in China
Expatriate footballers in the Netherlands
Expatriate footballers in Italy
Expatriate footballers in Germany
Expatriate footballers in England
Expatriate footballers in China
FIFA Century Club
Floridsdorfer AC players